Cumberlidge is a surname. Notable people with the surname include:

 Arthur Cumberlidge (1914–1983), English footballer
 David Cumberlidge (born 1996), English swimmer